Östersundom (previously known in Finnish as Itäsalmi) is a subdistrict of Helsinki, Finland, near to the border of Sipoo. The area previously belonged to the municipality of Sipoo, but it was annexed to Helsinki on January 1, 2009 as part of the Southwest Sipoo Association, although the municipality of Sipoo opposed the idea.

Östersundom Manor and its side manor Björkudden, where Zachris Topelius lived for the last years, are located in Östersundom.

See also
 East Helsinki
 Itämetro
 Sipoo

References

Neighbourhoods of Helsinki